Domenico Aspari (4 August 1746 – 8 April 1831) was an Italian painter and engraver.

Life
Aspari was born at Milan in 1746, and studied under Valdrighi at Parma, where he executed some decorative paintings for the Ducal Palace. On his return to Milan, he almost entirely gave up painting in order to devote his attention to engraving, forming his style from that of Piranesi: in this branch of art he was very successful. His masterpiece of painting is the Madonna and Child enthroned, with Saints, which he executed for the church of Osnago. His self-portrait is in the Milan Gallery. He was a professor of painting at the Brera Academy. He died in 1831, and was replaced by Agostino Comerio as professor.

Works
His engravings include
 The Flight into Egypt; after a picture said to be by Correggio.
 The Last Supper; after Leonardo da Vinci.
 M. Peregrina Amoretti; after Boroni.
 Twenty-three Views of Milan.

References

Sources
 

1746 births
1831 deaths
18th-century Italian painters
Italian male painters
19th-century Italian painters
Italian engravers
Artists from Milan
Academic staff of Brera Academy
19th-century Italian male artists
18th-century engravers
19th-century engravers
18th-century Italian male artists